X-ray specs are a type of novelty eyewear, purported to allow the user to see through or into solid objects.

X-Ray Specs may also refer to:
 X-Ray Specs (comic strip), a UK comic strip
 "X-Ray Specs", a 1991 song by Sweet

See also
 X-Ray Spex, an English punk band